Mei Bo (Chinese: 梅伯; Pinyin: Méi Bó) was an official of Shang dynasty and was killed by Di Xin, King Zhou of Shang.

Plot in fiction
In Fengshen Yanyi, Mei Bo is renowned as the Number One Grand Counselor to King Zhou himself; thus Mei Bo is a very high-ranking official under the Shang dynasty.

After Mei Bo had seen Royal Astrologer Du being escorted by guards through the Noon Gate, Mei Bo questioned Du and then ran off quickly to discuss matters with the king. With the assisted help of Prime Minister Shang Rong, Mei Bo effectively seized the chance to talk matters with the ignorant king. Mei Bo first barks at the king about the unjust punishment and soon death of Du, who was a loyal astrologer serving under the kingdom for over three generations. Mei Bo constantly tells the king that wiping out one of your most loyal officials without just cause is such that of removing a section of your own body. After the king ignored Mei Bo's words, he sentenced him to death through beating.

The king's favorite concubine, Daji, tells King Zhou it would be best to burn him alive in a large toaster for his "evil ways". When the toaster was finished, it had been over twenty feet tall with three levels of burning fire from three levels of burning charcoal; and two wheels to move it around like a chariot. Before Mei Bo was to be burned alive in the toaster, he uttered the words "You stupid king! My death is as light as a feather. It matters very little whether I die or live. I am one of your highest ranking counselors. I have served three generations of kings in this dynasty. What crime have I committed? I only fear that Cheng Tang's glorious reign will end by your stupidity and cruelty!"

Thus, the poor Mei Bo was stripped of all his clothes and was immediately thrown into the very large toaster. While in the toaster, large blood-curdling screams could be heard emitting from the toaster – thus instilling complete horror into the fellow officials and marking the death of one of many Shang loyalists.

Mei Bo was appointed as the deity of Tiande Star (天德星) in the end.

Notes

References
 Investiture of the Gods – Chapter 6 (pages 67–71)

Investiture of the Gods characters
Chinese gods
Shang dynasty politicians